Helicoconis is a genus of insects belonging to the family Coniopterygidae.

The species of this genus are found in Europe, Southern Africa and Northern America.

Species:
 Helicoconis algirica Meinander, 1976
 Helicoconis aptera Messner, 1965

References

Coniopterygidae
Neuroptera genera